King of the Sun is the fourteenth and final studio album released by Australian rock music group The Saints. Recorded in Sydney, Australia, the album is a concept album based on a journey home after a hundred-year war.

Critical reception 

The album was met with mostly positive reviews from the Australian music press.  Patrick Emery from Beat Magazine noted: "With only minor exception, it’s Bailey in his finest whimsical folk-blues guise. The title track has a whiff of literary pretension, its lyrics a set of seemingly non-sequitur statements built around a simple melody and Bailey’s disaffected vocals. Sweet Chariot is arguably the classic contemporary Saints style – a lumbering blues-based pop lick and an aesthetic that sits perfectly with Bailey’s modern day Lord Byron persona. Million Miles Away (La De Bloody Da) would, if attended to in a brutal punk manner, be one of the great garage rock tracks; here, it’s an intriguing acoustic track of surprising depth. "

Track listing 
"King of the Sun"
"A Million Miles Away"
"Sweet Chariot"
"Turn"
"Mystified"
"Duty"
"Road to Oblivion Part 2"
"Craters on the Moon"
"Mini Mantra Part 1"
"Adventures in the Dark Arts of Watermelonery"

Bonus Disc "Songs from the Stash"

Also included in the 2012 CD release was a bonus disc called Songs from the Stash.  These featured nine songs from the post Ed Kuepper period.

"Just Like Fire Would" (from All Fools Day)
"Last and Laughing Mile" (from Howling)
"Massacre" (from Prodigal Son)
"Photograph" (from A Little Madness to Be Free)
"Ghost Ships" (from A Little Madness to Be Free and Prodigal Son)
"Shipwreck"  (from Prodigal Son)
"Fall of an Empire" (from Everybody Knows the Monkey)
"Something Wicked" (from Howling)
"All Fools Day" (from All Fools Day)

King of the Midnight Sun

In 2014, the album was issued in some territories as a double; the second disc is the same track listing, but all songs have been re-recorded with guitarist Barrington Francis and drummer Peter Wilkinson, who did not appear on the original record.

Personnel
Chris Bailey – vocals, guitar, bass
Sean Carey – guitar, sound engineering
Geoff Watson – drums
Danny Carmichael – trombone
Simon Ferenci – trumpet
John Glase – harmonica
Any Judd – keyboards, piano
Amelia Rutherford – cello
Fortunato Luchresi – producer

References

The Saints (Australian band) albums
2012 albums
Fire Records (UK) albums